Lena Mihailovic is an Australian female water polo Olympian. She was born in Belgrade, Serbia in 1996.

Early life 
Her father was a professional water polo player until 2005 and Mihailovic lived in many different parts of the world including Montenegro, Italy and Turkey.

Achievements 
She was a member of the Arizona State University (ASU) and became the university’s top-ten all-time scorer with 131 goals. She left ASU in 2018 and played for Ferencvarosi, a Hungarian league team.

In Australia, Mihailovic competes for the ACU Cronulla Sharks Water Polo Club. She made her Australian debut at the 2014 World Youth Championships. She also competed at the 2015 World Junior and the 2017 FINA World Championships.

Mihailovic was a member of the Australian Stingrays squad that competed at the Tokyo 2020 Olympics. The Head Coach was Predrag Mihailović. By finishing second in their pool, the Aussie Stingers went through to the quarterfinals. They were beaten 8-9 by Russia and therefore did not compete for an Olympic medal. Australia at the 2020 Summer Olympics details the team's performance in depth.

The Head Coach at the time was her father Predrag Mihailović.

References 

1996 births
Living people
Australian female water polo players
Water polo players at the 2020 Summer Olympics
Olympic water polo players of Australia

Naturalised citizens of Australia
Serbian emigrants to Australia